The Lex Ursonensis is the foundation charter of the  Caesarean colonia Iulia Genetiva at Urso near Osuna (province of Seville, Andalusia) in southern Spain. A copy of its text was inscribed on bronze under the Flavians, portions of which were discovered in 1870/71.   The original law spanned nine tablets with three or five columns of text each and comprised over 140 sections (rubricae).  Of these four tablets survive, including sections 61-82, 91-106 and 123-134.  Remains are kept in the National Archaeological Museum of Spain, in Madrid.

The charter was approved by the Roman assembly as a law proposed probably by Mark Antony after the assassination of Julius Caesar.

Bibliography

Notes

External links
Lex Ursonensis (Latin)
English translation

Roman law
1st century BC in Hispania
Latin inscriptions
Collection of the National Archaeological Museum, Madrid